Abū Karib As’ad al-Kāmil,, called "Abū Karīb", full name: Abu Karib As'ad ibn Hassān Maliki Karib Yuha'min,  was king (Tubba') of the Himyarite Kingdom (modern day Yemen). He ruled Yemen from 378-430. ʼAsʽad is cited in some sources as the first of several kings of the Arabian Peninsula to convert to Judaism, although some scholars doubt it. He was the first one to cover the Kaaba with the kiswah.

Conversion

While some sources agree that Abu Karab was the first of the Himyarite kings to convert to Judaism, the circumstances of his conversion are immersed in myth and legend. According to the traditional account, Abu Karib undertook a military expedition to eliminate the growing influence of Byzantium in his northern provinces.  His forces reached Medina, which was then known as "Yathrib". Not meeting any resistance, they passed through the town, leaving one of the king’s sons behind as governor of the town. A few days later, however, the people of Yathrib killed their new governor, the king's son.  Upon receiving the news, the king turned his troops back to avenge his son’s death, and destroy the town. He ordered that all palm trees around the town be cut down, because the trees were the main source of the town's inhabitants' income, and then laid siege to the town.

The Jews of Yathrib fought alongside their pagan Arab neighbors, trying to protect their town. During the siege, Abu Karab fell ill.  Two local Jewish scholars, named Kaab and Assad, took the opportunity to travel to his camp, and persuaded him to lift the siege. The scholars also inspired in the King an interest in Judaism, and he converted in 390, persuading his army to do likewise.  Kaab and Assad later returned with Abu Karab to his kingdom, where they were tasked with converting the population. However, while some scholars say the population converted on a wholesale basis, others opine that only about half became converts, the rest maintaining their pagan beliefs and temples. Among those who converted to Judaism was Harith Ibn-Amru, a nephew of Abu Karab, whom Abu-Karab appointed Viceroy of the Maadites on the Red Sea, and headed the government of Mecca and Yathrib.

Tubba Abu Karab As'ad is said to have been killed by his own soldiers, who tired of his constant military campaigns. He left three sons: Hassan, Amru, and Zorah (Yusuf).

One dissenter from the view that Abu Karab was a convert to Judaism is author J. R. Porter. Writing in the 1980s, Porter argued that the accounts of Karab's conversion first appear much later in the historical record and are therefore unreliable. Porter nonetheless acknowledged that a move toward Judaism on Karab's part would be "entirely credible", given the presence of powerful Jewish tribes in Yathrib. Porter states that a later Himyarite King, Dhu Nowas (517–525 CE) was "certainly" a convert to Judaism.

References

External links
The Persian conquest of Jerusalem in 614CE compared with Islamic conquest of 638CE

4th-century Arabs
5th-century Arabs
Jewish royalty
Kings of Himyar
Jewish monarchs
Converts to Judaism from paganism
Yemenite Jews
Year of death unknown
Year of birth unknown
Middle Eastern kings